Eresus sedilloti is a spider species found in Portugal and Spain.

See also 
 List of Eresidae species

References

External links 

Eresidae
Spiders of Europe
Fauna of Portugal
Fauna of Spain
Spiders described in 1881